Adolph (or Adolf) Gottfried Kinau (4 January 1814 – 9 January 1888) was a German Protestant minister and astronomer.

Born in Aschersleben into a family of ministers and teachers, he studied theology in Halle and Magdeburg from 1833 to 1840. Until 1851, he had several appointments as teacher. Till 1861 he was minister in Rohr in Thuringia. Until his death he was minister at the Kreuzkirche in Suhl, Thuringia. He had several offices in charity and school system.

Kinau was known as selenographer who had specialised in lunar rills. In 1847 he discovered six lunar rilles and continued to make lunar drawings all his life. The lunar crater Kinau is named after him.

References
 Kinau in "Wöchentliche Unterhaltungen für Dilettanten und Freunde der Astronomie, Geographie und Witterungskunde, herausgegeben von G.A. Jahn",  2ter Jahr., nr. 25 (1848), 201-204
 J.C. Houzeau, A. Lancaster: "Bibliographie générale de l'astronomie jusqu'en 1880", Tome II, column 1247
 Olaf Kretzer: "Gottfried Adolf Kinau: Ein Pfarrer aus Suhl, verewigt auf dem Mond?" Sterne und Weltraum (Oktober/2005) S. 84 ff
 R.A. Garfinkle and B. Pfeiffer: "Discovery of the real person behind the name of the lunar crater Kinau", Journal of the British Astronomical Association 117 (2007) 81

1814 births
1888 deaths
19th-century German astronomers
People from the Province of Saxony
Martin Luther University of Halle-Wittenberg alumni